The following is a list of riots and civil unrest in Omaha, Nebraska. With its economic roots in cattle processing, meatpacking, railroads, manufacturing and jobbing, the history of Omaha has events typical of struggles in other American cities over early 20th-century industrialization and labor problems. Racial tension was deeply based in economic and social competition as older immigrants had to contend with different ethnic groups from eastern and southern Europe and African Americans from the South. The latter were recruited for jobs in the expanding meatpacking plants as World War I shut off immigration from Europe. While numerous African Americans migrated to the city in its growing industrial phase, they were a distinct minority within the overall state population. Civil disorder in Omaha has related to the most critical events and tensions of an era, from showing support of homeless people in the 1890s; to anti-strikebreaker sentiment, focused on new Japanese residents at the turn of the 20th century; to anti-war events in the 1970s. The 1960s inner-city riots that destroyed parts of the Near North Side neighborhood were another manifestation of social and economic tension breaking out in violence.

Often the violence did little to resolve the problems at their roots: for instance, labor inequities were persistent because of major industries' opposition to unionizing and insistence on "open shop" policies into the 1940s and beyond. Just as workers were finally achieving some successes, industries underwent major restructuring, causing loss of tens of thousands of jobs and movement of industrial work away from Omaha, stranding many in the working classes for some time. The challenges facing African Americans in Omaha with regard to economic inequity and social immobility also persist but the form has varied with social and economic changes. The racial tension persists in part because of problems with crime arising from dysfunctions of poverty, entwined issues of class and race, and the relative geographic and social isolation of some of the minority communities.

19th century
In the late 19th century civil unrest in Omaha was chiefly related to labor disputes that arose with industrialization. During the 1880s and '90s, the Governor of Nebraska repeatedly sent in the state militia during labor disputes in the smelting, railroad and meatpacking house industries. In 1895 the American Protective Association threatened large-scale riots throughout the city after Nebraska state law forced a complete alteration of the police and fire boards in the city.

20th century
Social tensions related to two world wars and several labor disputes resulted in violent upheavals in the first half of the 20th century, including the lynching of a black man in Omaha, followed by a race riot in 1919. The first recorded incidences of recorded racial discrimination occurred, pitting whites against Japanese and Greek immigrants. The emerging civil rights movement in Omaha raised expectations and the Vietnam War produced its own tensions. In the 1960s, African Americans violently protested in several different events, reacting against police brutality and other issues.

The Great Depression
The Great Depression forced millions of people out of work through the 1930s and caused upheaval across the U.S. The struggle for control over work was a struggle for life, and most Americans were affected.

Post-World War II
The aftermath of World War II brought apparent tranquility to much of the nation. However, in working class cities such as Omaha, labor unrest continued to weigh heavily on industry while the middle class was burgeoning. Restructuring of major industries rapidly cost tens of thousands of jobs in Omaha in the railroad and meatpacking industries in the decades after 1950. Members of the working class who could not quickly adapt were isolated in North and South Omaha as the economy retracted. With decreasing revenues, the city and businesses decreased investments in existing housing and infrastructure. At the same time, the city was expanding away from the river, with growth to new suburbs and development in the west, leading to white flight from many inner-city neighborhoods. Some new-style white collar jobs migrated to that area as well, or were concentrated in downtown.

Civil rights and Vietnam War protests

The Civil Rights Movement in the United States and in Omaha resulted in demands against racism and for black power in the city, at a time when youth throughout the city were being drafted to fight in the Vietnam War. Resistance increased to what was perceived as mistreatment and police brutality, resulting in protests and riots, the repercussions of which are still felt today in some communities.

21st century
Instances of mass violence in the 21st century have taken the form of police response to protests against police brutality: the George Floyd protests in Nebraska and protests of the Shooting of James Scurlock.

See also
 Ethnic groups in Omaha, Nebraska
 Timeline of racial tension in Omaha, Nebraska
 A Time for Burning
 Crime in Omaha
 History of Omaha
 List of incidents of civil unrest in the United States

References

Bibliography
 Pratt, W.C. "Advancing Packinghouse unionism in South Omaha, 1917-1920," Journal of the West. 35:2, 42–49.
 Warren, W.J. "The impasse of radicalism and race: Omaha's meatpacking unionism, 1945-1955," Journal of the West. 35:2, 50–54.
 Fogarty, H.A. "Long Packinghouse Strike Hurts Business in Omaha," The New York Times. May 2, 1948.
 "An Omaha Bicyclist Mobbed", The New York Times. June 21, 1895.

Riots
African-American history in Omaha, Nebraska
Omaha
Crimes in Omaha, Nebraska
Omaha, Nebraska
History of Omaha, Nebraska